Augustus Duncan Roberts was a politician in the Canadian province of Ontario, who served in the Legislative Assembly of Ontario from 1934 to 1937. He represented the electoral district of Sault Ste. Marie as a member of the Ontario Liberal Party.

External links
 

Year of birth missing
Year of death missing
Ontario Liberal Party MPPs